is a town located in Tochigi Prefecture, Japan.  ,  the town had an estimated population of 29,528 in 12,618 households, and a population density of 420 persons per km². The total area of the town is

Geography
Takanezawa is located in the flatlands of east-central Tochigi Prefecture with an average elevation of 109–195 meters. Over 65% of the town area is agricultural. The town is bordered by Utsunomiya to the west, across the Kinugawa River.

Surrounding municipalities
Tochigi Prefecture
 Utsunomiya
 Sakura
 Nasukarasuyama
 Ichikai
 Haga

Climate
Nasu has a Humid continental climate (Köppen Cfa) characterized by warm summers and cold winters with heavy snowfall.  The average annual temperature in Nasu is 13.2 °C. The average annual rainfall is 1424 mm with September as the wettest month. The temperatures are highest on average in August, at around 25.4 °C, and lowest in January, at around -1.8 °C.

Demographics
Per Japanese census data, the population of Takanezawa has recently plateaued after a long period of growth.

History
Akutsu village, Kitatakanezawa village, and Niita village were created within Shioya District of Tochigi Prefecture on April 1, 1889 with the creation of the modern municipalities system after the Meiji Restoration. In April 1953 Akutsu village was elevated in status into Akutsu town. On March 31, 1954, Niita village was dissolved, with a portion merging with Kitatakanezawa village, and a portion going to Ujie Town (also in Shioya District). Akutsu and Kitatakanezawa merged on April 1, 1958 to create the town of Takanezawa.

Government
Takanezawa has a mayor-council form of government with a directly elected mayor and a unicameral town council of 16 members. Takanezawa, together with the city of Sakura and town of Shioya collectively contributes two members to the Tochigi Prefectural Assembly. In terms of national politics, the town is part of Tochigi 2nd district of the lower house of the Diet of Japan.

Economy
The economy of Takanezawa is heavily dependent on agriculture, with rice cultivation as the primary crop. Secondary crops include tobacco, wheat, strawberries and pears. The town is increasingly becoming a bedroom community for neighboring Utsunomiya.

Education
Takanezawa has six public primary schools and two public middle schools operated by the town government. The town has one public high school operated by the Tochigi Prefectural Board of Education

Transportation

Railway
 JR East – Tōhoku Main Line (Utsunomiya Line)

 JR East – Karasuyama Line
 Hōshakuji -  -

Highway

Local attractions
Takanezawa Onsen

References

External links

Official Website 

Towns in Tochigi Prefecture
Takanezawa, Tochigi